The shiner perch (Cymatogaster aggregata) is a common surfperch found in estuaries, lagoons, and coastal streams along the Pacific coast from Alaska to Baja California. It is the sole member of its genus.  The shiner perch is also known as seven-eleven and shiner seaperch.

Shiner perches are similar to tule perches, deep-bodied with a dusky greenish back and silvery sides that have a pattern combining fine horizontal bars with three broad yellow vertical bars. Breeding males turn almost entirely black, the barred pattern being obscured by dark speckles. Shiner perches are distinguished from tule perches by having fewer dorsal fin spines, just 8–9 vs the 15–19 of the tule perch. The rayed part of the dorsal fin has 18 to 23 rays. The anal fin has 3 spines followed by 22–25 rays.

They are one of the most common fish in the bays and estuaries of their range, favoring beds of eelgrass, and often accumulating around piers as well. They feed on zooplankton such as copepods, but have been observed to bottom feed as well.

They are often found with parasitic isopods such as the Elthusa californica feeding off of them from their opercular cavity of the gill chamber.

References 

 Peter B. Moyle, Inland Fishes of California (University of California Press, 2002), pp. 428–429
 

Embiotocidae
Fish described in 1854